Eva Kacanu is a Paralympian athlete from the Czech Republic competing mainly in category F54/F56 shot put events.

She competed at the 2004 Summer Paralympics in Athens, Greece. There she won a silver medal in the women's shot put F54/F55 event.

Four years later she competed at the 2008 Summer Paralympics in Beijing, China. This time she won the women's shot put F54/F56 event.

External links
 

Paralympic athletes of the Czech Republic
Athletes (track and field) at the 2008 Summer Paralympics
Athletes (track and field) at the 2004 Summer Paralympics
Paralympic silver medalists for the Czech Republic
Paralympic gold medalists for the Czech Republic
Living people
Medalists at the 2004 Summer Paralympics
Medalists at the 2008 Summer Paralympics
Year of birth missing (living people)
Paralympic medalists in athletics (track and field)
Czech female shot putters
Wheelchair shot putters
Paralympic shot putters
Athletes (track and field) at the 2016 Summer Paralympics